650 may refer to:
 650 (number)
 Area code 650
 IBM 650 magnetic drum data-processing machine, introduced in 1953
 The year 650 BCE
 The year 650 CE